PAE G.S. Diagoras 1905 is a Hellenic professional football club based in Rhodes city founded in 1905. 

Diagoras is named after the island's  ancient athlete Diagoras. 

The team first played under Ottoman Rule until the short lived independence of the Dodecanese in 1912 and then under the italian occupation of the island. No matches at all were held during the Balkan Wars and the team played only with other local teams until the Dodecanese joined with the rest of Greece in 1948.

History
Due to the club's extensive social, cultural, athletic, and particularly patriotic activities, the fascist Italian authorities in occupation decided to dissolve it in 1929. Diagoras reconstituted in 1945, just prior to the liberation of Rhodes and the union with the rest of Hellas. 
He first joined the Beta Ethniki (2nd national division) in its creation in 1962-'63. They played in Alpha Ethniki (1st national division) between 1986-1989.

In 1987, the club reached the semi-finals of the Greek Cup, losing to OFI.

Diagoras returned to Beta Ethinki in 2008 until 2012.

In the 2019–2020 season, Diagoras finished in third place of the Football League (3rd tier) and was promoted to the Super League 2 (Beta Ethniki), the second tier of the professional football in Hellas.

Players

Current squad

League participation

First Division (3): 1986–1989
Second Division (22): 1962–1968, 1974–1975, 1980–1986, 1989–1992, 2008–2012, 2020–present
Third Division (9): 1978–1980, 1992–1993, 2005–2008, 2017–2020
Fourth Division (5): 1993–1994, 2002–2005, 2012–2013
Local Championships (8): 1998–2002, 2013–2017

Honours

Domestic
Leagues:
Second Division   
 Winners (1): 1985–86
Runners-up (4): 1963–64, 1965–66, 1966–67, 1982–83
Third Division   
 Winners (3): 1974, 1979–80, 2007–08
 Runners-up (1): 2018–19
Fourth Division   
 Winners (1): 2004–05
Dodecanese FCA Championship (Local Championship)   
 Winners (17): 1947–48, 1948–49, 1949–50, 1950–51, 1951–52, 1952–53, 1953–54, 1954–55, 1955–56, 1956–57, 1957–58, 1958–59, 1960–61, 1973–74, 1978–79, 2001–02, 2016–17

Cups:
Dodecanese FCA Cup (Local Cup)   
 Winners (13): 1948, 1952, 1953, 1954, 1957, 1963, 1965, 1966, 1968, 1974, 2004, 2017, 2018

Dodecanese Super Cup: Winners 2019

Rivalries: A.S. Rodos 1968

References

External links
 Official Website

Association football clubs established in 1905
Rhodes (city)
Football clubs in South Aegean
1905 establishments in Greece
Sport in Rhodes
Multi-sport clubs in Greece
Super League Greece 2 clubs